Silvestro Andreozzi (1575–1648) was a Roman Catholic prelate who served as Bishop of Penne e Atri (1621–1648).

Biography
Silvestro Andreozzi was born in Lucca, Italy in 1575.
On 17 March 1621, he was appointed during the papacy of Pope Paul V as Bishop of Penne e Atri.
On 18 April 1621, he was consecrated bishop by Giovanni Garzia Mellini, Cardinal-Priest of Santi Quattro Coronati with Attilio Amalteo, Titular Archbishop of Athenae, and Paolo De Curtis, Bishop Emeritus of Isernia, serving as co-consecrators. 
He served as Bishop of Penne e Atri until his death in January 1648. 
While bishop, he was the principal co-consecrator of Costantino de Rossi, Bishop of Cefalonia e Zante (1634).

References

External links and additional sources
 (Chronology of Bishops) 
 (Chronology of Bishops) 

17th-century Italian Roman Catholic bishops
Bishops appointed by Pope Paul V
1575 births
1648 deaths